Sunrise Vista is an unincorporated community in Lake County, California.

References

Unincorporated communities in California
Unincorporated communities in Lake County, California